FK Poprad is a Slovak football team, based in the town of Poprad. The club was founded in 1906.  The team play in the Slovak 2. liga, the second tier of Slovak football, having been there since promotion from 3. liga in 2014. The club have played home matches at the NTC Poprad.

Historical timeline 
 1906 – Founded as Sport Egylet
 1909 – Renamed  Matejovský atletický klub (MAC)
 1939 – Renamed Slovenský atletický klub – SAC
 1945 – Renamed ŠK SSM
 1951 – Renamed  Spartak Poprad
 1974 – Renamed TJ Tatramat Poprad
 1975 – Renamed TJ Vagónka Poprad
 2001 – merged with PFC Poprad into 1. PFC Tatramat
 2004 – Renamed 1. PFC Poprad
 2005 – merged with FC Tatran Poprad-Veľká into MFK Poprad
 2008 – Renamed FK Aquacity Poprad
 2010 – Renamed FK Poprad
source:

Honours
 Slovak Cup  (1961–Present)
 Semi-finals (1):  2016–17

Sponsorship

Players

Current squad 
Updated 21 November 2021

Out on loan

Notable players
Had international caps for their respective countries. Players whose name is listed in bold represented their countries while playing for FK.

Past (and present) players who are the subjects of Wikipedia articles can be found here.
 Alekos Alekou
 Koloman Gögh 
 Kamil Kopúnek
 Juraj Szikora
 Kathon St. Hillaire
 Stanislav Šesták

Reserve team
FK Poprad B was the reserve team of FK Poprad. They last played in the third-level football league in Slovakia 3. Liga (East).

Staff

Current technical staff 
Updated 25 May 2019

Managers
	
 Vladimír Lajčák (2010–2015)
 Pavol Mlynár (2015–2016)
 František Šturma (2016–2017)
 Jaroslav Belejčák (2017–2019)
 Marek Petruš (11/2019)
 Peter Ďuriš (11/2019-01/2020) (interim)
 Jaroslav Belejčák (01/2020-07/2020)
 Stanislav Ďuriš (07/2020-11/2020)
 Jaroslav Rybár (12/2020)
 Ján Guziar (01/2021-05/2021)
 Vladimír Lajčák (07/2021-)

References

External links 
Official website 
 

Poprad
Sport in Poprad
Association football clubs established in 1906
1906 establishments in Slovakia